The Ecological Green Party of Mexico (PVEM or PVE) is a green-conservative political party in Mexico. In the 2012 legislative elections, the party took 34 seats in the Chamber of Deputies (out of 500) and nine seats in the Senate (out of 128). During the 2012 Presidential election, PVEM supported Enrique Peña Nieto (EPN), the candidate from the Institutional Revolutionary Party (PRI), who was elected. In 2018, PVEM supported Todos por México coalition, along with PRI and PANAL. José Antonio Meade, the coalition's candidate, came in third in a four-way race, with 16.43% of the vote. PVEM later withdrew from Todos por Mexico and gradually came close to the government, formally entering the Juntos Haremos Historia coalition in 2019. In December 2020 it founded the Juntos Hacemos Historia coalition, together with the National Regeneration Movement and the Labor Party and contested the 2021 Mexican legislative elections with them.

Controversies

Pro-death penalty campaign

In 2008, the PVEM initiated an advertising campaign in favor of reintroducing the death penalty in Mexico. This led to the European Green Party's withdrawal of recognition of the PVEM as a legitimate green party.

Anti-LGBT rights factions
During an interview, PVEM candidate Gamaliel Ramirez verbally attacked an openly gay candidate for Guadalajara mayor and called for criminal laws against homosexuality to be established. In the following days, Ramirez issued a written apology after the party expressed disappointment at his remarks.

While the party has pledged to support LGBT rights issues, its three representatives abstained from a vote on Mexico City granting legal recognition to same-sex couples and opposed the legalization of same-sex marriage in the city.

Accusations of corruption and nepotism
The PVEM is also widely criticized because its current leader, Jorge Emilio González Martínez, was appointed for being the son of former leader Jorge González Torres, and for supporting the political and business agenda of Mexican businessman Víctor González Torres, owner of the Farmacias Similares drugstore franchise and González Martínez's uncle.

The Quintana Roo state branch of PVEM removed its leader, José de la Peña Ruiz de Chávez, for his relationship with the Romanian mafia on February 10, 2021. He kept his position as a member of the Congress of Quintana Roo. José Luis Jonathan Yong, former Public Security director in Cancun (2016-2018) has been implicated. De la Peña Ruiz de Chávez is said to also have ties to Leticia Rodríguez Lara "Doña Lety", leader of the Cancun drug cartel.

Unlawful political advertising in movie theaters
In January 2015, the National Electoral Institute (INE) ordered the PVEM and theater chains Cinemex and Cinépolis to cease airing PVEM advertisements on the grounds of fairness in electoral contests. When the PVEM and the theaters did not comply, the INE imposed a fine of $35 million on the PVEM and $7 million on both theater chains.

2021 post-campaign influencer posts
In 2021, several Internet celebrities were fined for illegal posts in favor of PVEM on social media after the period of campaigning had ended. Fer Moreno admitted she had been paid MXN $10,000 (US$) and apologized.

Electoral history

Presidential elections

Congressional elections

Chamber of Deputies

Senate elections

Gubernatorial victories
Ricardo Gallardo Cardona won the 2021 Mexican gubernatorial elections in San Luis Potosi.

References

Further reading
Death penalty debate grows in Mexico
Mexico to rethink death penalty

 
Political parties established in 1993
Political parties in Mexico
Green conservative parties